Pierce is a city in and county seat of Pierce County, Nebraska, United States.  The population was 1,767 at the 2010 census.

History
Pierce was platted in 1871, and a courthouse was erected that same year. Like Pierce County, the name honors President Franklin Pierce.

The city became a point of international interest in 2013 due to the Lambrecht auto auction, at which nearly 500 classic cars were put up for sale.

Geography
Pierce is located at  (42.199477, -97.529321).

Demographics

It is part of the Norfolk, Nebraska Micropolitan Statistical Area.

2010 census
At the 2010 census there were 1,767 people, 706 households, and 479 families living in the city. The racial makeup of the city was 98.9% White, 0.3% Native American, 0.2% Asian, 0.2% from other races, and 0.5% from two or more races. Hispanic or Latino of any race were 1.2%.

Of the 706 households 34.0% had children under the age of 18 living with them, 53.8% were married couples living together, 8.8% had a female householder with no husband present, 5.2% had a male householder with no wife present, and 32.2% were non-families. 29.3% of households were one person and 16.6% were one person aged 65 or older. The average household size was 2.41 and the average family size was 2.97.

The median age was 40.2 years. 26% of residents were under the age of 18; 6.6% were between the ages of 18 and 24; 23.9% were from 25 to 44; 24.6% were from 45 to 64; and 18.8% were 65 or older. The gender makeup of the city was 49.8% male and 50.2% female.

2000 census
At the 2000 census, there were 1,774 people, 682 households, and 465 families living in the city. The population density was 2,023.2 people per square mile (778.3/km2). There were 736 housing units at an average density of 839.4 per square mile (322.9/km2). The racial makeup of the city was 99.10% White, 0.23% Native American, 0.11% Asian, 0.06% Pacific Islander, 0.23% from other races, and 0.28% from two or more races. Hispanic or Latino of any race were 0.73% of the population.

Of the 682 households 35.0% had children under the age of 18 living with them, 58.1% were married couples living together, 7.5% had a female householder with no husband present, and 31.7% were non-families. 29.5% of households were one person and 17.4% were one person aged 65 or older. The average household size was 2.50 and the average family size was 3.12.

The age distribution was 28.2% under the age of 18, 8.3% from 18 to 24, 25.4% from 25 to 44, 18.1% from 45 to 64, and 20.1% 65 or older. The median age was 38 years. For every 100 females, there were 92.2 males. For every 100 females age 18 and over, there were 87.6 males.

The median household income was $35,288, and the median family income  was $43,068. Males had a median income of $27,436 versus $21,034 for females. The per capita income for the city was $15,702. About 6.7% of families and 8.6% of the population were below the poverty line, including 6.9% of those under age 18 and 14.4% of those age 65 or over.

Points of interest
 Gilman Park Arboretum
 Willow Creek State Recreation Area, located 4 miles southwest of Pierce.

References

External links
 Community of Pierce
 Pierce Public Schools
 Arboretum

Cities in Pierce County, Nebraska
Cities in Nebraska
County seats in Nebraska
Norfolk Micropolitan Statistical Area